Vilhelm Rasmus Andreas Andersen (16 October 1864 – 3 April 1953) was a Danish author, literary historian and intellectual, who primarily focused on the study of Danish literature. He was one of the first to use the term "Golden Age of Culture" to refer to the 1800s, and his focus on bringing Danish literature to the public earned him great popularity. Andersen was instrumental in the development of the School of Radio, as a means of disseminating public education to prevent loss of cultural identity and treasures.

Biography
Vilhelm Rasmus Andreas Andersen was born on 16 October 1864 in Nordrup at Ringsted in the Slagelse Municipality of Denmark, son of Frederik Vilhelm Andersen. He graduated from Sorø Academy in 1882, having studied language and literature. He continued his studies at the University of Copenhagen taking his examinations in 1888. He won the University's Gold Medal in Nordic philology in 1891 and took his doctorate in 1896 with his thesis Guldhornene (The Golden Horns). He was appointed a professor of Danish literature in 1908 by Copenhagen University.

In these works he attempts to penetrate the poet's intentions both through linguistic analysis and by psychological study, particularly for the works of Poul Møller and Adam Oehlenschläger. There are smaller scientific papers drawing on philology, the study of language development. Andersen later returned to Møller (1904) and Oehlenschläger, (1917) and wrote smaller works on Frederik Paludan-Müller, Henrik Pontoppidan, and Vilhelm Topsøe.

In 1918 Andersen was appointed as a full professor in Nordic literature at the university, and held that post until 1930. His intellectual, historical masterpieces cover the various periods of Danish literature and attempt to bind the study of classical literature with the domestic growth in Danish and European intellectual life over the centuries.

His teaching and writing had great influence on the foundations of Denmark’s national literature. In his later period, he wrote "" (Illustrated Danish Literary History) in four volumes with Carl S. Petersen and a libretto for Carl Nielsen's opera Maskarade based on Holberg’s comedy. Andersen traveled the country and was popular for his readings and lectures on literature which he presented on Danmarks Radio. He helped create the country's radio school.

Andersen received many honors and awards throughout his life, including the University of Copenhagen Gold medal, the Tietgenkollegeit Medal and, in 1934, the Holberg Medal, becoming its first recipient. He was an honorary member of the Danish Writers Society and an honorary citizen of Ringsted.

He died on 3 April 1953 in Hillerød. A collection of his articles  was published posthumously in 1986.

Selected works
 Andersen, Vilhelm.  Gyldendal: Copenhagen (1894) (in Danish)
 Andersen, Vilhelm Rasmus Andreas.  Nordiske forlag, E. Bojesen: Copenhagen (1896) (in Danish)
 Andersen, Vilhelm Rasmus Andreas.  Nordiske forlag, E. Bojesen: Copenhagen (1899–1900) (in Danish)
 Andersen, Vilhelm.  Gad: Copenhagen (1904) (in Danish)
 Andersen, Vilhelm.  Gyldendal: Kristiania (1904) (in Danish)
 Andersen, Vilhelm.  Nordiske forlag, E. Bojesen: Copenhagen (1907) (in Danish)
 Andersen, Vilhelm.  Boghandel: Copenhagen (1909) (in Danish)
 Andersen, Vilhelm Rasmus Andreas. Paludan-Müller Gyldendal: Copenhagen (1910) (in Danish)
 Andersen, Vilhelm.  Gyldendalske Boghandel: Copenhagen (1916) (in Danish)
 Andersen, Vilhelm.  Gyldendalske Boghandel: Copenhagen (1917) (in Danish)
 Andersen, Vilhelm.  Gyldendal: Copenhagen (1917) (in Danish)
 Andersen, Vilhelm.  Gad: Copenhagen (1922) (in Danish)
 Andersen, Vilhelm.  Aschehoug: Copenhagen (1922) (in Danish)
 Andersen, Vilhelm.  Aschehoug: Copenhagen (1924) (in Danish)
 Andersen, Vilhelm.  Gyldendal: Copenhagen (1933) (in Danish)
 Andersen, Vilhelm Rasmus Andreas; Carl S Petersen and Richard Jakob Paulli. I Gyldendal: Copenhagen (1924–34) (in Danish)
 Andersen, Vilhelm.  GyldendalGyldendal: Copenhagen (1939) (in Danish)
 Andersen, Vilhelm.  GyldendalGyldendal: Copenhagen (1940) (in Danish)
 Andersen, Vilhelm.  GyldendalGyldendal: Copenhagen (1942) (in Danish)
 Andersen, Vilhelm.  GyldendalGyldendal: Copenhagen (1948) (in Danish)
 Andersen, Vilhelm.  GyldendalGyldendal: Copenhagen (1949) (in Danish)
 Andersen, Vilhelm.  GyldendalGyldendal: Copenhagen (1951) (in Danish)
 Andersen, Vilhelm and Per Dahl.  Gyldendal: Copenhagen (1985) (in Danish)

References

External links
 Catalogue of works
 Vilhelm Andersen deutsche-digitale-bibliothek.de (in German)

1864 births
1953 deaths
Danish educators
19th-century Danish historians
20th-century Danish historians
Opera librettists
19th-century Danish writers
20th-century Danish writers
University of Copenhagen alumni
Academic staff of the University of Copenhagen
People from Slagelse Municipality
19th-century male writers
20th-century Danish male writers
19th-century Danish educators
20th-century Danish educators